Kevin Kantee (born January 29, 1984) is an American born Finnish professional ice hockey defenceman. He was drafted by the Chicago Blackhawks as their sixth-round pick, #188 overall, in the 2002 NHL Entry Draft. He played for Jokerit, TPS, Ilves and JYP in the Finnish SM-liiga 2003-2010, and transferred to HDD Olimpija Ljubljana in the Austrian Hockey League for the 2010-2011 season. He is currently signed with HC Valpellice in the Italian Serie A.

Kantee was born to Finnish parents in Idaho Falls, Idaho, U.S., and holds dual citizenship of Finland and the U.S.

In an incident on October 27, 2007, Kantee was attacked by Ässät defenceman Matt Nickerson in the locker room corridor in the Ässät arena after an Ilves-Ässät game. Nickerson was already serving a prior suspension, and was suspended for five more games as a result of the incident.

Career statistics

Regular season and playoffs

International

References

1984 births
Finnish ice hockey defencemen
Chicago Blackhawks draft picks
Jokerit players
Living people
People from Idaho Falls, Idaho
HC TPS players
Ilves players
HDD Olimpija Ljubljana players
Ice hockey people from Idaho
American people of Finnish descent